Mubarak bin Dohak (born 11 November 1961 at Pantai, Seremban), is the 16th and current Dato' Klana Petra Sri Jaya (or Undang) of Luak Sungai Ujong, one of the traditional states of Negeri Sembilan, Malaysia. He was installed on 29 December 1993. He is the head of the Waris Hulu lineage; the other noble lineage of Sungai Ujong is Waris Hilir.

References

1961 births
Living people
People from Negeri Sembilan
Royal House of Negeri Sembilan
Malaysian people of Minangkabau descent
Malaysian Muslims